The current municipality of Ignacio de la Llave, previously known as San Cristobal de la Llave, is placed in the popularly known region of La Mixtequilla, which is located in the western limit of the Papaloapan river, going through the Blanco, Limón and Las Pozas rivers. The climate of the region varie between hot-humid and tropical-humid, with frequent summer rains between July and September. The average temperature is from 64 and 72 ºF, with a maximum registered in the hi 70 ºF and the lowest in the hi 40 ºF. Ignacio de la Llave is neighbor and has deep political, social and trading relationships with: Alvarado, Acula, Ixmatlahuacan, Tlalixcoyan and Tierra Blanca.

The municipality celebrates its carnival in the month of March were music, dances and joy are spread by its inhabitants.

Mayor Juan José Flores Lira died of a heart attack on April 24, 2017.

Toponymy 
The towns name comes from General Ignacio de la Llave, who was governor for the state of Veracruz from 1861 to 1862. It shares its name with the state of Veracruz, just in a different order.

Physical medium

Location 
It's located in the central zone of the state of Veracruz, in the previously known zone named Las llanuras del sotavento, in the economic-administrative region called Papaloapan.

Borders 
It borders on the north with the municipalities of Tlalixcoyan and Alvarado, to the south with Ixmatlahuacan and Tierra Blanca, to the west with Tierra Blanca and Tlalixcoyan and to the east with Alvarado and Ixmatlahuacan.

References 

Municipalities of Veracruz